The Teachers Service Commission (TSC) of Kenya is an Independent government Commission established under the Constitution of Kenya to manage human resources within the education sector. It is based in the capital city, Nairobi with offices in the counties

Role 
The role of the commission as defined in the constitution are:
 Register trained teachers
 Recruit and employ registered teachers
 Assign teachers employed by the commission for service in any public school or institution
 Promote and transfer teachers
 Exercise disciplinary control over teachers
 Terminate the employment of teachers

Other Roles are:
 Review the standards of education and training of persons entering the teaching service
 Review the demand for and the supply of teachers
 Advise the national government on matters relating to the teaching profession.

Membership 
The current membership of the Commission consists of:
 Edwin Marita
 Mbarak Twahir
 Tache Bonsa Gollo
 Kinoti Imanyara
 Beatrice Marembo
 Albert Andrew Fred Ekirapa

TSC Payslip Online 
The Teachers Service Commission has introduce an online portal where teachers registered with the commission can check their payslip information or updates.

To check their payslips, Kenyan teachers can visit this page.

References

External links 
 'Official Site'
 'Teachers Service Commission App'

Politics of Kenya
Government agencies of Kenya
2012 in Kenya
Law of Kenya 
Kenya articles by importance